The 2014–15 National League 2 North is the sixth season (28th overall) of the fourth tier of the English domestic rugby union competitions since the professionalised format of the second division was introduced. New teams to the division include Hull Ionians (relegated from National League 1 2013–14), Broadstreet (promoted from National League 3 Midlands), Huddersfield and Stockport (both promoted from National League 3 North). Ampthill was also transferred back to the division after spending the 2013–14 season in National League 2 South. At the end of the season the champions are promoted to National League 1 while the second placed team will play against the runners-up from the 2014–15 National League 2 South, with the winner also promoted. The bottom three teams, depending on geographical location, are usually relegated to either National League 3 North or National League 3 Midlands (in some cases teams may be relegated to the southern regional leagues).

Hull Ionians claimed the title and promotion to National League 1 on the last day of the season, with Ampthill finishing as runners-up and having to be content with a promotion play-off. Both Hull Ionians and Ampthill were head and shoulders over the other teams in the division, with Ionians narrow 7 – 6 victory over Ampthill on 24 January ultimately being the deciding factor in who would end up as champions.

While the title chase was tight, the fight against relegation was even tighter. Apart from Stockport, who were relegated way before the end of the season, the next two relegation spots were contested up until the very last game with four teams in danger of the drop. In the end Hull's defeat to fellow relegation rivals Preston Grasshoppers meant they went straight down, while Birmingham & Solihull's bonus point victory was not enough due to Luctonians narrow win over Leicester Lions, meaning that Luctonians stayed up instead. On paper Birmingham & Solihull had a better attack and defence than Luctonians but were unable to translate this to enough wins over the course of the season.  Stockport and Hull would drop down to National League 3 North while Birmingham & Solihull would go into National League 3 Midlands.

As runner-up, Ampthill played in the divisional play-off for the second year in a row (they lost the play-off in 2013–14 against Darlington Mowden Park). This year they played at home to National League 2 South runner-up Bishop's Stortford. The final result was 19 – 10 to Ampthill at Dillingham Park, and they join Hull Ionians in the 2015–16 National League 1.

Structure
The league consists of sixteen teams with all the teams playing each other on a home and away basis to make a total of thirty matches each. There is one automatic promotion place, one play-off place and three relegation places. The champions are promoted to the 2015–16 National League 1 and the runner-up play the second-placed team in the 2014–15 National League 2 South with the winner being promoted. The last three teams are relegated to either National League 3 Midlands or National League 3 North depending on the geographical location of the team.

Participating teams and locations
Eleven of the teams listed below participated in the 2013–14 National League 2 North season; Hull Ionians were relegated from National League 1, Huddersfield (champions) and Stockport (play-offs) were promoted from National League 3 North, Broadstreet were promoted from National League 3 Midlands and Ampthill were transferred from National League 2 South to ensure that both leagues were suitably balanced with the same number of teams.

League table

Results

Round 1

Round 2

Round 3

Round 4

Round 5

Round 6

Round 7

Round 8

Round 9

Round 10

Round 11

Round 12

Round 13

Round 14

Round 15

Round 16

Round 17

Round 18

Round 19

Postponed due to frozen pitch.  Game replayed on 28 February.

Round 20

Postponed due to bad weather.  Game replayed on 28 February.

Round 21

Postponed due to snow. Game replayed on 28 March.

Round 22

Round 23

Round 24

Rounds 19 & 20 (rescheduled games)

Round 25

Round 26

Round 21 (rescheduled game)

Round 27

Round 28

Round 29

Round 30

Promotion play-off
Each season, the runners-up in the National League 2 North and National League 2 South participate in a play-off for promotion to National Division 1. Ampthill, the runner-up in the North and, because they had a better record than the South runner-up, Bishop's Stortford hosted the match.

Average attendances
 Does not include play-off.

Individual statistics
 Note that points scorers includes tries as well as conversions, penalties and drop goals.  Appearance figures also include coming on as substitutes (unused substitutes not included).

Top points scorers

Top try scorers

Season records

Team
Largest home win – 59 pts 
66 – 7 Ampthill at home to Leicester Lions on 13 September 2014
Largest away win – 75 pts
85 - 10 Sedgley Park away to Stockport on 13 September 2014
Most points scored – 85 pts 
85 - 10 Sedgley Park away to Stockport on 13 September 2014
Most tries in a match – 13
Sedgley Park away to Stockport on 13 September 2014
Most conversions in a match – 10
Sedgley Park away to Stockport on 13 September 2014
Most penalties in a match – 9
Luctonians at home to Birmingham & Solihull on 15 November 2014
Most drop goals in a match – 1
N/A - multiple times

Player
Most points in a match – 36
 Caolan Ryan for Stourbridge at home to Preston Grasshoppers on 29 November 2014
Most tries in a match – 4 (x2)
 Callum McShane for Sedgley Park away to Stockport on 13 September 2014
 Joe Bercis for Ampthill away to Broadstreet on 13 December 2014
Most conversions in a match – 9
 Matt Riley for Sedgley Park away to Stockport on 13 September 2014
Most penalties in a match – 9
 Louis Silver for Luctonians at home to Birmingham & Solihull on 15 November 2015
Most drop goals in a match – 1
N/A - multiple players

Attendances
Highest – 1,201
Preston Grasshoppers at home against Caldy on 18 April 2015
Lowest – 54
Leicester Lions at home against Chester on 14 March 2015
Highest Average Attendance – 404
Luctonians
Lowest Average Attendance – 109
Leicester Lions

See also
 English rugby union system
 Rugby union in England

References

External links
 NCA Rugby

2014-15
2014–15 in English rugby union leagues